Peter Dombrovskis (2 March 194528 March 1996) was an Australian photographer, known for his Tasmanian scenes.  In 2003, he was posthumously inducted into the International Photography Hall of Fame, the first Australian photographer to achieve that honour.

Biography
Dombrovskis was born in 1945 in a refugee camp in Wiesbaden, Germany of Latvian parents. The protégé of noted wildlife photographer and activist Olegas Truchanas, his photographs of the Tasmanian Wilderness, particularly his own annual Tasmanian Wilderness Calendar and the Wilderness Calendar produced by the Tasmanian Wilderness Society, brought images of once remote and inaccessible areas of the state into the public realm. Dombrovskis founded West Wind Press in 1977 and later went on to print calendars entirely of his own work, featuring incisive commentary from pre-eminent environmental professionals.

His most famous photograph is Morning Mist, Rock Island Bend, Franklin River, which some commentators believe played a part in the victory of Bob Hawke in the 1983 Australian federal election. The photograph portrayed a section of the Franklin River which was to be submerged by the proposed Franklin Dam, and it highlighted the visual appeal of the Franklin River during the contentious "No Dams" campaign of 1982. In 1983, Dombrovskis published a book, Wild Rivers, co-authored with Bob Brown, which exemplified his skill in photographing the Gordon and Franklin rivers.

On 28 March 1996, Dombrovskis died of a heart attack while photographing near Mount Hayes, in the Western Arthurs mountain range in South-West Tasmania.

His works are represented in the collections of the National Gallery of Australia in Canberra, the National Gallery of Victoria, the Tasmanian Museum and Art Gallery, the Australian Heritage Commission, and in private hands.

Exhibitions 
 2017 - Dombrovskis: Journeys into the Wild, National Library of Australia - Canberra, Australia
 2020 - Tasmanian Wilderness, Cradle Mountain Wilderness Gallery - Cradle Mountain, Australia

See also 

Gordon Splits
Olegas Truchanas
David Tatnall (photographer)

References

External links
 
Dombrovskis collection of Tasmanian wilderness photographs, 1978–1995, National Library of Australia, Canberra, a collection of 21 colour photographs
Gallery of photos by Truchanas and Dombrovskis

1945 births
1996 deaths
Photographers from Tasmania
People from Hobart
Australian people of Latvian descent
German emigrants to Australia
Nature photographers